São José dos Campos-Professor Urbano Ernesto Stumpf International Airport , is the airport serving São José dos Campos, Brazil. It is named after Urbano Ernesto Stumpf (1916–1998), colonel-aviator, Aerospace Engineer, professor at several universities and inventor of the motor that runs on ethanol fuel.

The airport is operated by Aeropart.

The airport shares some facilities with the Brazilian Department of Aerospace Science and Technology, Embraer and the flying club of São José dos Campos.

History
Built in the 1950s basically to serve CTA, the airport originally had only a dirt runway. In the 1970s, the runway was paved with asphalt and lengthened to 3,000 meters. The airport was also equipped to handle instrument landings and an apron that is able to accommodate large cargo aircraft.

It has been certified for international cargo flights since 2000. Treatment of cargo, as well as fees for warehousing and handling, are similar to those of other Infraero freight terminals. However some discounts are applied seeking to reduce costs and streamline the clearance process, an important factor for local industries.

The passenger terminal has a capacity for 90,000/year and is served by a snack bar, taxis and public telephones.

On May 18, 2018 it was announced that TAM Museum would be relocated close to the Brazilian Aerospace Memorial at the airport, near the Embraer plant. This museum has a collection of vintage aircraft and was closed on February 2, 2016 at São Carlos Airport.

On December 2, 2020, the Federal Government signed and agreement to transfer the administration of the airport from Infraero to the Municipality of São José dos Campos. 

On February 21, 2022 Aeropart won a 30-year concession to operate the airport.

Airlines and destinations
No scheduled flights operate at this airport.

Accidents and incidents
19 May 1986: An ATC at SJK spotted three bright red objects around the airport, in what would be the 1986 Brazilian UFO incident.
8 July 1988: a Brazilian Air Force Embraer EMB 120RT Brasília registration FAB-2001 crashed during an engine-out landing at São José dos Campos. Five of the 9 occupants died.
9 July 1997: a TAM Airlines Fokker 100 registration PT-WHK operating flight 283 en route from São José dos Campos to São Paulo-Congonhas was climbing after take-off from São José dos Campos when a bomb exploded in the rear part of the passenger cabin. The uncontrolled decompression blew one passenger out of the aircraft. The aircraft made a successful emergency landing in São Paulo, despite the hole in the fuselage.

Access

See also

List of airports in Brazil

References

External links

Airports in São Paulo (state)
São José dos Campos